Boys Planet is a South Korean reality television show, where trainees from around the world, primarily South Korea, China, Hong Kong, Taiwan, Japan, Thailand, Vietnam, the United States, and Canada, are competing to debut in a nine-member boy group. The 98 contestants form two large groups (K-Group and G-Group), each consisting of 49 contestants. After the final episode, the final top nine contestants will be selected to debut.

Contestants

The English names of contestants are presented in Eastern order in accordance with the official website.

The ages of all contestants are presented in accordance with the international age system as of Episode 1 (February 2, 2023).

Color key

Prior to Boys Planet

Star Level Test (Episode 1–2)
Key

All star – 
3 star – 
2 star – 
1 star – 
No star – 

The Star Level Test involves the contestants rating their own skills out of four stars by placing stickers on their name tags, before being re-assessed by the show's mentors through performances.

Bold team numbers are teams whose performances were partially or entirely unaired on broadcast.

Signal Song Test (Episode 2–3)
Key
  – star level maintained
  – star level upgraded
  – star level downgraded

The top row indicates the initial level assigned after the Star Level Test, while the first column indicates the new level after the re-assessment.

K vs G Group Battle (Episode 3–4)
Color key:

Bold denotes the contestant who picked the team members.

All members of the winning team from each battle will receive a benefit of 100,000 points. In addition, because K-Group won the group battle with an overall score of 3,615 points, the Korean contestants will receive an additional 10,000 points to their cumulative rank points for the first ranking announcement.

With 222 points, "Back Door" K-Team received the most points out of the 14 teams and got to perform on M Countdown on March 2, 2023. In addition, they filmed a performance video and further PR content that was posted on the Studio Choom YouTube channel on March 1.

Dual Position Battle (Episode 6–7)
Color key:

For the Dual Position Battle, each contestant chose a song. However, trainees with a higher rank were allowed to remove lower-ranked trainees from a team once it had hit its capacity to free up a spot for themselves. The contestants that had been kicked out from a group then needed to join another song.

Each member of the team that scores highest in their respective category will receive a benefit of 100,000 points. Furthermore, Zhang Hao, Kim Gyu-vin, and Park Han-bin will receive an additional 150,000 points to their cumulative rank points for the second ranking announcement as they have scored highest within their winning team. The three winning teams, "Tomboy", "Love Killa", and "LAW", get to perform on M Countdown and will receive a promotional banner on the Mnet Plus app.

Artist Battle

Color key:

Notes

References

Boys Planet
Lists of reality show participants